1976–77 was the second season that Division 1 operated as the second tier of ice hockey in Sweden, below the top-flight Elitserien (now the SHL).

Division 1 was divided into four starting groups, based on geography.  The top four teams in the group would continue to the playoffs to determine which clubs would participate in the qualifier for promotion to Elitserien. The bottom two/three teams in each group were relegated to Division 2 for the 1977–78 season.

Regular season

Northern Group

Western Group

Eastern Group

Southern Group

Playoffs

North/West

First round
 Timrå IK - Strömsbro IF 2:0 (8:3, 5:2)
 Kiruna AIF - Hofors IK 2:0 (9:0, 5:4)
 KB Karlskoga - Bodens BK 2:0 (11:0, 7:4)
 Mora IK - IFK Kiruna 2:0 (6:3, 4:0)

Second round 
 Timrå IK - Mora IK 2:1 (8:4, 2:4, 7:1)
 KB Karlskoga - Kiruna AIF 2:1 (5:2, 0:6, 7:5)

South/East

First round 
 Djurgårdens IF - IFK Bäcken 2:0 (5:4, 5:1)
 Huddinge IK - Halmstads HK 2:0 (10:6, 6:2)
 HV71 - Hammarby IF 2:1 (7:1, 2:3, 6:3)
 Tingsryds AIF - Almtuna IS 2:0 (6:2, 6:5)

Second round 
 Djurgårdens IF - Tingsryds AIF 2:0 (2:1, 3:2)
 HV71 - Huddinge IK 2:1 (6:2, 2:4, 4:3)

Elitserien promotion

External links
Historical Division 1 statistics on Svenskhockey.com

Swedish Division I seasons
2
Swe